Fort Battleford was the sixth North-West Mounted Police fort to be established in the North-West Territories of Canada, and played a central role in the events of the North-West Rebellion of 1885. It was here Chief Poundmaker was arrested, and where six Cree and two Stoney men were hanged for murders committed in the Frog Lake Massacre and the Looting of Battleford. In reference to the hanging, Prime Minister John A. Macdonald said in a letter that "the executions... ought to convince the Red Man that the White Man governs."

Its location near the confluence of the North Saskatchewan and the Battle rivers offered access to fresh water, as it was many years before an on-site well was made available; and offered an alternative means of transportation to the Red River cart. As the site was on a plateau, the fort was easily defensible, and offered clear lines of sight for the surrounding area and to Government Ridge – thus providing warning against possible attacks. The fort sheltered around 500 people, and they helped to fortify Battleford.

Battleford being designated capital of the North-West Territories played a substantial role in the decision to locate the fort there. The government's belief was that the presence of the NWMP would act as a civilizing influence on the First Nations in the area and help them to transition from their nomadic lifestyle to a more stationary one, modelled on European societies. They also hoped that the NWMP would assist settlers in their homesteading efforts and their presence in the area would encourage the people to respect the law.

The difficulties that had plagued Native American–government relations in the United States, along with the high Aboriginal population in the Battleford area, further prompted the federal government to establish a strong NWMP presence. Both the Canadian government and the First Nations were quite aware of what had transpired south of the "Medicine Line" and sought to follow a different path.

The original Canadian Pacific Railway route was also to pass through Battleford, along the Qu'Appelle route, but it was eventually built on a more southerly route, which resulted in the moving of the capital of the North-West Territories from Battleford to Regina, then known as Pile o' Bones.

Legacy 
In the spring of 2008, Tourism, Parks, Culture and Sport Minister Christine Tell proclaimed in Duck Lake that "the 125th commemoration, in 2010, of the 1885 Northwest Resistance is an excellent opportunity to tell the story of the prairie Métis and First Nations peoples' struggle with Government forces and how it has shaped Canada today."

Fort Otter was constructed at Battleford's government house located at the capital of the North-West Territories (1876 and 1883).  The largest Canadian mass hanging occurred here when eight First Nations men were executed for murder in the aftermath of the Frog Lake Massacre.

The fort was designated a National Historic Site of Canada in 1923, known as Fort Battleford National Historic Site, to commemorate its role as military base of operations for Cut Knife Hill, Fort Pitt, as a refuge for 500 area settlers and its role in the Siege of Battleford.

References

External links 
 Fort Battleford National Historic Site - official site

Military history of Saskatchewan
Military history of the Northwest Territories
Battleford
Battleford
Parks in Saskatchewan
National Historic Sites in Saskatchewan
Museums in Saskatchewan
Law enforcement museums in Canada
History museums in Canada
Forts or trading posts on the National Historic Sites of Canada register
Canadian Register of Historic Places in Saskatchewan